Attalea cohune, commonly known as the cohune palm (also rain tree, American oil palm, corozo palm or manaca palm), is a species of palm tree native to Mexico and parts of Central America.

The cohune palm is used in the production of cohune oil and its nut can be used as a variety of vegetable ivory.

Example occurrences
A chief occurrence as a dominant plant is in the Belizean pine forests ecoregion.

References

cohune
Plants described in 1844
Trees of Belize
Trees of Campeche
Trees of Chiapas
Trees of Colima
Trees of El Salvador
Trees of Guatemala
Trees of Honduras
Trees of Jalisco
Trees of Michoacán
Trees of Oaxaca
Trees of Quintana Roo
Trees of Tabasco